Pannalal Institution is the oldest school of Kalyani township area. It is situated at 11 no. Ward, B Block in Kalyani, Nadia district in the Indian state of West Bengal. The institution was established in 1956. This is a Boys school with Upper Primary with Secondary and Co-education in the Higher Secondary section having Science, Arts and Commerce streams. The School is affiliated to West Bengal Board of Secondary Education, West Bengal Council of Higher Secondary Education and recognised by School Education Department, West Bengal.

Notable alumni
 Manoj Prasad, Indian scientist

References

High schools and secondary schools in West Bengal
Schools in Nadia district
Educational institutions established in 1956
1956 establishments in West Bengal